Wyrms (1987) is a science fiction novel by American writer Orson Scott Card. The story examines desire, wisdom, and human will.  Card describes a version of the tri-partite soul, similar to that articulated by Plato in The Republic.

Plot introduction
The primary protagonist in the story is Patience, a fifteen-year-old girl who is the only daughter of the rightful king (the Heptarch). Her father, Peace, willingly lives as a slave to the usurper King Oruc, serving him as a faithful diplomat and assassin.  Despite his genuine belief that King Oruc is "the best Heptarch the world could hope for at this time", Peace ensures that Patience learns the skills she will need as future Heptarch through the stern lessons of her tutor Angel. From an early age, Patience is fluent in dozens of languages, trained in diplomatic protocols and assassination techniques, and taught to be guarded and watchful at all times.

When she is thirteen, Patience learns of an ancient prophecy that – as the seventh seventh seventh daughter of the Starship Captain, the first human to set foot on their planet of Imakulata – she is destined to give birth to Kristos, who will bring either eternal salvation or eternal destruction to the world. An entire religion has been constructed around the legends of the Starship Captain and his descendants. Thousands of people, called Vigilants, stand ready to aid Patience in reclaiming the Heptarchy and fulfilling the prophecy at the center of their religion.

Plot summary
King Oruc, fearing Patience or Peace could be a danger to his reign, keeps them under control by allowing only one of them to leave the castle at a time.  However, this delicate hostage situation falls apart when Peace becomes ill. Before he dies, Patience cuts into Peace's shoulder to retrieve a crystal globe hidden under his skin.  "The scepter of the Heptarchs," he says. "Never let a  know you have it."

Only moments after Peace dies, King Oruc sends an assassin after Patience. Since the heads are coerced to speak only the truth, Patience forces her father to divulge his darkest secrets. The "Cranning Call," as it was known, drew the world's greatest thinkers and achievers to make a pilgrimage to Cranning, never to be seen or heard from again. Peace says the source of the Call is the Unwyrm, attempting to summon Patience to his lair.

Outside the castle, Patience feels the Cranning Call and decides she will go to Cranning to challenge the Unwyrm. Even as the Cranning Call becomes stronger and more urgent, she chooses her own routes towards the city in defiance of the Unwyrm's power. All their lives, Ruin and Reck had been repelled from Cranning by the Unwyrm, but the Cranning Call surrounding Patience cancels the repulsion and allows them to travel with her. Will, the silent but strong human who had lived as Reck's slave, joins their party.

They stop by a house advertising simply ANSWERS. The owner, a  named Heffiji, gives them a crash course in the strange genetics of Imakulata, in which every native plant or animal derives from a single originating species: a black segmented insect, or wyrm. Surgically implanted in the brain, it transfers the memories of the previous owners to the current host while absorbing new memories. Ruin – a skilled surgeon - agrees to insert the crystal into Patience's brain.

Patience spends the next 40 days half-crazy, processing the memories of previous Heptarchs and the alien minds of  kings. She relives the moment when the Starship Captain, lured through lust to the surface, mates with the Wyrm in its lair beneath a glacier that would later become Cranwater. Finally, Patience understands the Cranning Call is summoning her to mate with the Unwyrm, so that he can impregnate her with Kristos, spawning a superior human race.

Even as her lust for Unwyrm grows, Patience knows she must kill him or the world will be doomed. She explains it all to the rest of her companions, and they continue their journey to meet and hopefully kill Unwyrm before he is able to bring his dark plans to fruition. When it is all over Patience hopes to take her place as Heptarch and unite all of the planet's species together in peace. Following several twists and turns, the group finally reach their final destination and confront Unwyrm in his ice cave. Patience and her companions then come to terms with all that has happened and set about making the world a fairer place for all the species of Imakulata.

The fictional world of Wyrms
Wyrms is set on Imakulata, a far-future planet that was colonized by humans thousands of years before the book begins.  Ore for producing hard metal is extremely rare on Imakulata, most of the deposits having been destroyed by the Starship Captain – the first human to set foot on the new world – while his ship was still in orbit.

The genetic code of species on Imakulata is malleable, displaying dramatic evolutionary changes in only a few generations.  As one character notes, "every creature's genetic molecule, which is the mirror of the will, obeys the slighest command to change."

Species

Geblings

Physically, they resemble furry, stunted humans with long, forked, mobile tongues. Children eat their dead parent's , so that they can absorb their ancestors' most cherished memories.

Dwelfs

Gaunts

Gaunts resemble lithe, beautiful humans.  They have no will of their own.  They respond telepathically to the desires of those around them and attempt to satisfy whatever desire is strongest.  For that reason they are often employed as prostitutes.

Comparison to other works
Like many of Card's works, this story is a metaphor. It looks at, among other things, the desires of the flesh, and how succumbing to them is dangerous.

The story bears some similarities to other books by Orson Scott Card. A Planet Called Treason also took place on a planet without ore. Patience is a child turned savior, similar to other protagonists in Card's works like Ender Wiggin, Alvin Maker and Lanik Mueller. The semi-conscious self-modifying organism native to Imakulata (which becomes, eventually, Unwyrm) resembles the Descolada from Speaker for the Dead.

See also

Wyrms (comics)
List of works by Orson Scott Card
Orson Scott Card

References

External links
 Chapter one, from Card's site

1987 American novels
1987 science fiction novels
Novels by Orson Scott Card
American science fiction novels
Tor Books books